Puerto Ingeniero Ibáñez Airport,  is an airport serving Puerto Ingeniero Ibáñez, a town in the Aysén Region of Chile. The town is at the head of Ibáñez Bay, a bay off the northern side of General Carrera Lake. The runway lies between the mouth of the Ibáñez River and the town.

There is mountainous terrain north and east of the airport, and rising terrain to the west. South approach and departure are over the water.

See also

Transport in Chile
List of airports in Chile

References

External links
OpenStreetMap - Puerto Ingeniero Ibáñez
OurAirports - Puerto Ingeniero Ibáñez
SkyVector - Puerto Ingeniero Ibáñez

Airports in Chile
Airports in Aysén Region